The Center for Medicare and Medicaid Innovation (CMMI; also known as the CMS Innovation Center) is an organization of the United States government under the Centers for Medicare and Medicaid Services (CMS). It was created by the Patient Protection and Affordable Care Act, the 2010 U.S. health care reform legislation. CMS provides healthcare coverage to more than 100 million Americans through Medicare, Medicaid, the Children’s Health Insurance Program (CHIP), and the Health Insurance Marketplace. 

"The center is to test innovative payment and delivery system models that show important promise for maintaining or improving the quality of care in Medicare, Medicaid, and the Children's Health Insurance Program (CHIP), while slowing the rate of growth in program costs". The center "is to give priority to twenty models specified in the law, including medical homes, all-payer payment reform, and arrangements that transition from fee-for-service reimbursement to global fees and salary-based payment". It is "intended to overcome antireform inertia by creating a mechanism for the diffusion of successful pilot programs" without requiring Congressional approval.

If a CMMI pilot model is considered successful, the Secretary of Health and Human Services may expand its duration and scope. To be considered a successful test, a model must meet three criteria: 
 The Secretary determines that such expansion is expected to— (A) reduce spending under the applicable title without reducing the quality of care; or (B) improve the quality of patient care without increasing spending;
 The Chief Actuary of the Centers for Medicare & Medicaid Services certifies that such expansion would reduce (or would not result in any increase in) net program spending under the applicable titles; and
 The Secretary determines that such expansion would not deny or limit the coverage or provision of benefits under the applicable title for applicable individuals.
Since its founding, CMMI has produced three models that have been certified for expansion based on meeting the above criteria: the Pioneer Accountable Care Organization (ACO) Model and the Medicare Diabetes Prevention Program, and Medicare Prior Authorization Model for Repetitive Scheduled Non-Emergent Ambulance Transport (RSNAT).

Leadership
CMMI is currently led by Deputy Administrator and Director Liz Fowler, who served as special assistant to President Obama on health care and economic policy at the National Economic Council. Previous directors include Adam Boehler and Patrick Conway.

References

External links
Official website

Healthcare reform in the United States
Medicare and Medicaid (United States)
United States Department of Health and Human Services
Medical and health organizations based in Maryland